(S,S)-Tetrahydrochrysene ((S,S)-THC) is a steroid-like nonsteroidal estrogen and agonist of both the estrogen receptors, ERα and ERβ. It is an enantiomer of (R,R)-tetrahydrochrysene ((R,R)-THC), which, in contrast, is an ERβ silent antagonist and ERα agonist with 10-fold selectivity (i.e., affinity) for the ERβ over the ERα and with 20-fold greater affinity for the ERβ relative to that of (S,S)-THC.

See also
 2,8-DHHHC
 Chrysene

References

Synthetic estrogens